Hannah Silverman is an American female acrobatic gymnast. With partners Christina Antoniades and Emily Ruppert, Silverman competed in the 2014 Acrobatic Gymnastics World Championships. Hannah was born in Columbia, MD and lives in 
Clarksville, MD. 
Hannah retired in 2016, going into her senior year of high school, due to various head injuries. These occurred while she was in Belgium, in 2016. She is currently following her dreams to become a pediatric RN. 

Career:
Competed at the 2016 World Championships
2014 U.S. champion (women's group)
Competed at the 2014 World Championships
2013 U.S. champion (woman's group)
Competed at the 2012 World Championships
2012 U.S. champion (woman's group)

References

1999 births
Living people
American acrobatic gymnasts
Female acrobatic gymnasts
21st-century American women